Typhoon Quedan may refer to:
 Tropical Storm Kajiki (2001) (T0124, 30W, Quedan) – struck the Philippines
 Tropical Depression Quedan (2005) (25W) – a tropical depression that was only recognized by PAGASA and JTWC
 Typhoon Melor (2009) (T0918, 20W, Quedan)
 Typhoon Fitow (2013) (T1323, 22W, Quedan)
 Severe Tropical Storm Saola (2017) (T1722, 27W, Quedan)

Pacific typhoon set index articles